The Ontario Gurdwaras Committee is a group of over 20 gurdwaras located in Ontario and Quebec.  A gurdwara (or), meaning "the doorway to the Guru", is the Sikh place of worship.  It organizes the annual Khalsa Day parade in Mississauga; over 100,000 people attended the parade in 2012. It should not be confused with the Ontario Sikhs and Gurdwara Council (OSGC), another organization.

In 2013 over 100,000 again participated in the celebrations which started at the Sri Guru Singh Sabha located in the Malton neighbourhood of Mississauga and culminated at the Sikh Spiritual Centre located in Toronto, Ontario.  This parade is unique as it crosses two different cities in two different regional municipalities. In 2009 the OGC decided to hold the parade during the first Sunday in May every year so that it will be the sole major event in the Greater Toronto Area that weekend.

Until 2004, the route of the parade was wholly in the City of Mississauga where it started at Sri Guru Singh Sabha and culminated at the Ontario Khalsa Darbar.  In 2001, the parade which took place wholly in Mississauga had over 100,000 attendees.

The Ontario Gurdwaras Committee also participates in various community and interfaith dialogues.  Most recently it was part of an interfaith coalition against casinos in Ontario.  It was a signatory to the Interfaith Statement Opposing Casino Expansion in Ontario in April 2013.  Through its member Gurdwara Sri Guru Nanak Sikh Centre (Glidden Road), the Committee also supported the Campaign against Child Poverty.

In August 2012 the Ontario Gurdwaras Committee along with other Sikh and non Sikh organizations and institutions held a candlelight vigil in honour of the people murdered in the Wisconsin Sikh Temple Shooting.  The vigil occurred on Saturday August 11, 2012 at Nathan Phillips Square located within Toronto City Hall.  Also in 2012, the OGC stood in solidarity with the victims of the Sandy Hook Elementary School shooting which took place in Newtown Connecticut.  In addition to attending a multi-faith vigil, a simran was held in memory of the victims at OGC member gurdwara Sri Guru Singh Sabha located in Malton Ontario.

On April 1, 2014, the Ontario Gurdwaras Committee proudly took part in celebrations in Queens Park hosted by Bramalea—Gore—Malton (provincial electoral district) Member of Provincial Parliament Jagmeet Singh.  These celebrations were to inaugurate April as Sikh Heritage Month in the Province of Ontario.

In 2016 the OGC along with the OSGC and the Punjabi media in Ontario made a joint effort to provide aid to the people of Fort McMurray by collectively donating over $400 000 dollars to help those affected by the 2016 Fort McMurray wildfire on behalf of the Sikh community of Ontario. The funds were provided directly to Alberta Premier Rachel Notley and the mayor of Regional Municipality of Wood Buffalo Melissa Blake.

In 2018 the Ontario Gurdwaras Committee also wrote a notice and lobbied Members of Parliament about the Indian Governments continued interference in Canadian domestic matters and diaspora Sikh affairs. This lobbying on the issue of the Indian governments pressure tactics on the City of Brampton to not allow an independent Punjab Pavilion in the annual Carabram program led to a stiff reply from the Canadian Minister of Foreign Affairs Chrystia Freeland against the Government of India.  In May 2018 an IED was set off outside the Bombay Bhel restaurant in Mississauga by unknown individuals.  The Government of India set up an information line immediately undermining an ongoing police investigation which led to a stiff rebuke from both the Ontario Gurdwaras Committee as well the Peel Regional Police for this interference in an active police investigation.

In early 2018 the Ontario Gurdwaras Committee led a worldwide to stop the continued interference of the Government of India in the domestic and internal affairs of the Sikh community.  They did this by instigating a ban of Indian officials from entering the premises of Sikh places of worship in any official capacity.  Eventually over 400 Sikh places of worship in Canada, Australia, Europe and the United States of America as well as many other countries.

The 2018 edition of the Khalsa Day Parade saw over 250,000 people attend and the parade was started by First Nations in a move towards reconciliation of the fact that diaspora Sikhs are settlers in traditional First Nations lands.

On a local level the O.G.C. held a community town hall in cooperation with United Sikhs to address the increase in youth violence in the Brampton area of Ontario.  Hundreds of community residents attended the town hall which saw so many residents attend that many hundreds had to be turned away from the door.  Members from Peel Police as well as local elected officials made a number of promises to community members and the O.G.C. promised to work with youth by having anti violence and newcomer orientations at its member gurdwaras.

See also
 Sikhism in Canada
 Sikhism in Ontario

References

Organizations based in Ontario
Sikhism in Canada